The ¡Alarma! Chronicles is the name of a short story written by Terry Scott Taylor. 

The story was originally included in four albums released by the rock band Daniel Amos. Part one was included in their 1981 release, ¡Alarma!, part two was included in their 1983 release, Doppelgänger, part three was included in their 1984 release, Vox Humana and the final part was included in their 1986 release, Fearful Symmetry. Each album musically and conceptually followed the themes of each part of the story.

The entire story was then released in its entirety in the 200 page hardcover book The ¡Alarma! Chronicles in 1999. That book also included three CDs with all of the music from the four previously mentioned albums, plus interviews with the band members, photos, essays and lyrics.

References 

1999 short stories
American short stories